Dictionary.com is an online dictionary whose domain was first registered on May 14, 1995. The primary content on Dictionary.com is a proprietary dictionary based on Random House Unabridged Dictionary, with editors for the site providing new and updated definitions. Supplementary content comes from the Collins English Dictionary, American Heritage Dictionary and others.

History
Dictionary.com was founded by Brian Kariger and Daniel Fierro as part of Lexico Publishing, which also started Thesaurus.com and Reference.com. At the time of its launch, it was one of the web's first in-depth reference sites. In July 2008, Lexico Publishing Group, LLC, was acquired by Ask.com, an IAC company, and renamed Dictionary.com, LLC. In 2018, IAC sold Dictionary.com and Thesaurus.com to Rock Holdings. At the time of the sale, Dictionary.com was the 447th most trafficked website in the United States, according to the website tracking service SimilarWeb. In 2015, they estimated that there are 5.5 billion word searches a year on its site.

Features and services
Among its features, Dictionary.com offers a Word of the Day, a crossword solver, and a pop culture dictionary that includes emoji and slang sections.

In 2010, Dictionary.com began a Word of the Year feature with the word 'change'. The selection is based on search trends on the site throughout the year and the news events that drive them. Dictionary.com's words of the year have been:
 2010: Change
 2011: Tergiversate
 2012: Bluster
 2013: Privacy
 2014: Exposure
 2015: Identity
 2016: Xenophobia
 2017: Complicit
 2018: Misinformation
 2019: Existential
 2020: Pandemic
 2021: Allyship
 2022: Woman

In April 2009, they launched an app on the App Store allowing users to find definitions and synonyms. It also included audio pronunciations, alphabetical indexing, and synonym example sentences. Since then, Dictionary.com released a standalone thesaurus app called Thesaurus Rex along with education apps, Dictionary.com Flashcards, Word Dynamo, and Learning to Read with Zoo Animals. 

In early 2020, in response to COVID-19 quarantine home-schooling needs, Dictionary.com launched an interactive platform for learning at home, and an online tutoring service.  Later that year Dictionary.com’s sister site, Thesaurus.com, launched a writing assistant and grammar checker called Grammar Coach. The coronavirus outbreak led to the addition of novel words to the main dictionary (e.g., fomites) and the slang dictionary (e.g., ‘rona’).

See also 
 Lexico
 Lists of dictionaries

References

External links

Online English dictionaries
Thesauri (lexicography)
Internet properties established in 1995
IAC (company)